Doto varaderoensis is a species of sea slug, a nudibranch, a marine gastropod mollusc in the family Dotidae.

Distribution
This species was described from Playa de Varadero, Cuba. It has also been reported from Puerto Rico  and Lake Worth Lagoon, Florida.

Description
The body of this nudibranch is translucent brown in colour. The cerata have numerous tubercles which are swollen and globular in appearance.

The maximum recorded body length is 10 mm.

Ecology
Minimum recorded depth is 1 m. Maximum recorded depth is 5 m.Doto varaderoensis was found associated with the hydroids Thyroscyphus'' sp. in the family Sertulariidae.

References

External links

Dotidae
Gastropods described in 2001